Fluminicola bipolaris is a fungal species in the family Papulosaceae of the Ascomycota. It was the only known species in the genus Fluminicola until 4 more new species were found in 2017 and 2021.

References

Sordariomycetes
Fungi described in 1998